Hamid Ezzine (born 5 October 1983) is a Moroccan long-distance runner who specialized in the 3000 metres steeplechase. He is a younger brother of the Olympic runner Ali Ezzine. He finished twelfth in the 5000 metres at the 2002 World Junior Championships, but then turned to the steeplechase. He finished fourth at the 2004 African Championships, won the gold medal at the 2005 Jeux de la Francophonie, finished fifth at the 2006 African Championships and eleventh at the 2007 World Athletics Final. He also competed at the 2005 World Championships, the 2007 World Championships and the 2008 Olympic Games without reaching the final.

His personal best time in the steeplechase is 8:09.72 minutes, achieved in July 2007 in Athens' Olympic Stadium. Up until then he had improved steadily from 8:47.67 minutes in 2003 (August, Casablanca) to 8:25.10 in 2004 (June, Rabat), 8:21.38 in 2005 (June, Rabat) and 8:19.37 in 2006 (June, Rabat). In late 2007 Ezzine was described in the official IAAF season reviews as one of that year's major breakthroughs statistically. His personal best in the 5000 metres is 14:00.6 minutes, achieved in June 2002 in Rabat.

Ezzine also finished 30th at the 2004 World Cross Country Championships, 41st at the 2005 World Cross Country Championships and 21st at the 2006 World Cross Country Championships, all in the short race. This earned him a fifth place in the team competition of 2004 and a bronze medal in the team competition of 2006.

In 2009 he was found guilty of refusal to submit to doping control and tampering with a doping control. For this he received a two-year suspension from the sport, lasting from March 2009 to March 2011. He returned to competition in late 2011 to win the silver medal in  3000 m steeplechase at the 2011 Pan Arab Games.  That year he also competed at the World Championships in Daegu, finishing 9th in the final. He reached the Olympic final in 2012, finishing in seventh place.  At the 2013 World Championships, he again finished 9th.

References

External links

 
 
 
 

1983 births
Living people
Moroccan male long-distance runners
Moroccan male steeplechase runners
Athletes (track and field) at the 2008 Summer Olympics
Athletes (track and field) at the 2012 Summer Olympics
Athletes (track and field) at the 2016 Summer Olympics
Olympic athletes of Morocco
Doping cases in athletics
Moroccan sportspeople in doping cases
People from Ain Taoujdate
World Athletics Championships athletes for Morocco
Mediterranean Games bronze medalists for Morocco
Mediterranean Games medalists in athletics
Athletes (track and field) at the 2013 Mediterranean Games
20th-century Moroccan people
21st-century Moroccan people